Dörpling, a municipality in the district of Dithmarschen in Schleswig-Holstein, Germany, was first mentioned in a document in 1320. Located 17 km north-east of Heide and 4 km east of Tellingstedt upon Eider, it has blurred boundaries with Pahlen. The ancient water mill - destroyed at the end of the 19th century - is said to have inspired a tale of writer Klaus Groth.

References

Dithmarschen